Club Atlético Welcome or simply Welcome is an Uruguayan basketball club in Montevideo, member of the Uruguayan Basketball Federation. It was founded on 13 October 1926. Welcome, recently promoted to the Uruguayan Basketball League (LUB) getting the second direct ascent in 2014. Its headquarters and metropolitan stage called "Estadio Oscar Magurno" is on the street Emilio Frugoni 924 corner Gonzalo Ramirez, in Parque Rodó neighborhood.

History 
With nine titles to its credit, Club Atlético Welcome is one of the most successful basketball clubs in the country. Along with Club Atlético Aguada y Club Atlético Atenas holds the record with four consecutive national championships obtained in the case of Welcome from 1997 to 2000. 

Other facts to note is that the Athletic Club Welcome emerged two of the most renowned players of Uruguay, as were Oscar Moglia and Wilfredo "Fefo" Ruiz, who was the top scorer in basketball of Uruguay, with record unequaled to this day, for example having scored 84 points in one game, when there was no rule of three-point shot. (This mark was achieved defending the club Neptune)

Club Atlético Welcome promoted by its youth academy the only Uruguayan player to have played in the NBA and currently playing in the Greek Basket League for the European powerhouse Panathinaikos, Esteban Batista, who had played for the Atlanta Hawks.

Titles 

Uruguayan League
 Winners (9): 1953, 1956, 1957, 1966, 1967, 1997, 1998, 1999, 2000

American competitions:
South American Club Championship
 Runners-up (3): 1967, 1968, 1998

Reference 

Basketball teams in Uruguay
Women's basketball in Uruguay
Basketball teams established in 1926